Bernard Poyet (3 May 1742, Dijon - 6 December 1824, Paris was a French architect; best known for his work on the Palais Bourbon.

Biography 
He was a student of Charles De Wailly who, in 1766, charged him with supervising the construction of a barn stable at the Château des Ormes. Although a utilitarian structure, it included the installation of a  sculpted pediment, depicting the goddess Cybele, by the King's sculptor, Augustin Pajou. In 1768, he took second place at the Prix de Rome with a project for a comic theatre. The following year, he obtained a stipend for a stay as a boarder at the Académie de France à Rome. Upon his departure, his proposals for a new main building at the Château were taken up by another student of De Wailly's, who worked on the project until 1783. 

Upon his return, he was named official architect to Louis Philippe I, Duke of Orléans and oversaw some small construction projects in the suburbs. In 1786, he was admitted to the Académie Royale d'Architecture and appointed Public Works Inspector for the City of Paris. During this time, he worked on reconstructing the 13th century  and enlarging the Sainte-Anne Hospital Center.

In 1790, he was named Architect of the City of Paris, and was made responsible for the city's water supply, which involved relocating the Fontaine des Innocents. In 1806, as a close associate of Lucien Bonaparte, he was entrusted to redesign and replace the decorations on the façade of the Palais Bourbon; facing the Seine.
He was elected to the Académie des Beaux-Arts in 1818; taking Seat #8 for architecture.

Several large projects were never realized; notably a plan to reconstruct the Hôtel-Dieu on the Île des Cygnes, in circular form, modelled after the Colosseum, with 5,000 beds. It would have been 200 meters (app.656 feet) wide, with three floors and a central courtyard. In 1786, a nine-member commission from the French Academy of Sciences examined the proposal, but found it too large, unsuited for the location, and much too expensive.

Throughout his career, he wrote memoirs and books on architecture. He was interred at the Cimetière du Père-Lachaise

References

Further reading 
 Philippe Cachau, Le château des Ormes ("Parcours du Patrimoine" collection), Inventaire de Poitou-Charentes, Geste éditions, 2013 
 Pierre-Louis Laget and Claude Laroche, L'hôpital en France : histoire et architecture, Lieux Dits, 2012 
 Pierre-Nicolas Sainte-Fare-Garnot and Pierre Martel, L'architecture hospitalière au XIXe siècle: l'exemple parisien, Éditions de la Réunion des musées nationaux, 1988

External links 

 "Histoire du Palais Bourbon et de l'hôtel de Lassay" @ the Assemblée Nationale website

1742 births
1824 deaths
Architects from Dijon
Burials at Père Lachaise Cemetery
Prix de Rome for architecture
Members of the Académie des beaux-arts